The grey pug (Eupithecia subfuscata) is a moth of the family Geometridae. It is found throughout the Palearctic region.  It is also found in North America. Since it does not place any special demands on climatic conditions, special caterpillar food plants, geological subsoil or the like it is a typical species of almost any Hochstaudenflur (plant corridor), where it occurs in the herb layer, in bushes and even on deciduous trees. It can be found on forest edges and hedgerows, on heath, in rocky places and wetlands, parks and gardens, as well as in villages and town centres.

Subspecies
There are two subspecies:
Eupithecia subfuscata subfuscata
Eupithecia subfuscata ussuriensis Dietze 1910 (Russian Far East, Japan)

Description
The forewings of this species are grey (occasionally with an ochreous tinge) marked with pale fascia and radial lines which give it a mottled appearance. There is a pale sub-marginal line and a small discal spot. The hindwings are much paler and plainer also with a small black discal spot. Melanism is quite common in this species. The wingspan is 17–21 mm. See also Prout  

Final instar larvae are smooth and elongated. They are grey-green or red-brown coloured and show a grey-green to dark olive-green diamond-like pattern on the back. The side edges are whitish.The pupa is yellow-brown with greenish wing sheaths. At the cremaster there are six hook bristles, the middle pair of which is more powerfully formed.

Biology
The adults fly in May and June with a second brood sometimes emerging in August. The species flies at night and is attracted to light.

The species overwinters as a pupa.

Larval food plants
The larva feeds on the leaves and flowers of a wide range of plants.

Abies – fir
Achillea
Aegopodium – ground-elder
Alnus – alder
Angelica
Artemisia
Betula – birch
Centaurea
Cirsium – creeping thistle
Comptonia – sweetfern
Epilobium – willowherb
Filipendula – meadowsweet
Galium – bedstraw
Hypericum – St John's wort
Larix – larch
Lysimachia – yellow loosestrife
Malus – apple
Ononis – restharrow
Picea – black spruce
Populus – poplar
Rubus – raspberry
Salix – willow
Scabiosa
Solidago – goldenrod
Tanacetum – tansy
Urtica – nettle
Valeriana – valerian

Similar species
Eupithecia virgaureata 
Eupithecia lariciata 
A safe determination is usually only possible by means of a genital morphological examination.

References

Chinery, Michael Collins Guide to the Insects of Britain and Western Europe 1986 (Reprinted 1991)
Skinner, Bernard Colour Identification Guide to Moths of the British Isles 1984

External links
Grey pug at UKMoths
Lepiforum e.V.

Eupithecia
Moths described in 1809
Moths of Asia
Moths of Europe
Moths of North America
Taxa named by Adrian Hardy Haworth